Minolta AF 50mm 1.7 is a discontinued lens with autofocus that was produced by Minolta for the company's A-mount from 1985 through 2006. It is still in use today by users of digital and film SLRs by Minolta (later Konica-Minolta) and Sony. The relatively large maximum aperture (1.7) allows the photographer to take shots indoors even when operating at ISO 100 - 200.

See also 
 List of Minolta A-mount lenses
 https://oriolderraphotography.wordpress.com/2016/02/22/review-minolta-50mm-af-zeiss-75-200mm/

External links 
 Description and photo of original 1985 version
 Description and photo of updated 1990 version
 Gallery of sample photos taken with original 1985 version
 https://oriolderraphotography.wordpress.com/2016/02/22/review-minolta-50mm-af-zeiss-75-200mm/

References 

50
Camera lenses introduced in 1985